Mark Cher Reed, Ed.D. is the 25th president of Loyola University of Chicago in Chicago, Illinois. Prior to his tenure at Loyola, Reed served as the first lay president of St. Joseph's University in Philadelphia, Pennsylvania.

Early life and education
Reed is a native of Huntingdon Valley, Pennsylvania and a 1992 graduate of the St. Joseph's Preparatory School. He earned a B.S. in mathematics from Fairfield University in 1996, where he was elected student-body president and received the Loyola Medal in recognition of his outstanding service to the university.

He went on to earn an M.Ed. in secondary school administration from the Boston College Lynch School of Education in 1999, an MBA from the Fairfield University Dolan School of Business in 2002, and an Ed.D. in higher education management from the University of Pennsylvania Graduate School of Education in 2008.

Career
Prior to serving at Loyola University Chicago and St. Joseph's University, Reed spent 15-years at Fairfield University in various administrative roles before rising to the position of senior vice president and chief of staff. He was also an adjunct professor in the mathematics department. In 2015, Reed received the Fairfield University Distinguished Faculty/Administrator Award.

References 

Living people
Year of birth missing (living people)
Presidents of Saint Joseph's University
Presidents of Loyola University Chicago
Fairfield University alumni
Lynch School of Education and Human Development alumni
University of Pennsylvania Graduate School of Education alumni
People from Montgomery County, Pennsylvania